Syringa josikaea, the Hungarian lilac, is a species of lilac, native to central and eastern Europe, in the Carpathian Mountains in Romania and western Ukraine.

It is a deciduous shrub growing to a height of 2–4 m. The leaves are elliptic-acute, 6–12 cm long, with a finely hairy margin. The flowers are dark pink, with a tubular base to the corolla 15 mm long with a narrow four-lobed apex 3–4 mm across, with a strong fragrance; they are produced in slender panicles up to 15 cm long in early summer. The fruit is a dry, smooth brown capsule, splitting in two to release the two winged seeds.

Cultivation and uses

Growing conditions allow for cool to temperate climate and are fully frost hardy. The plant also grows in full sun to semi shade. Despite its continental European origin, it has proved to be surprisingly successful when cultivated in the oceanic extremes of northwestern Europe on the Faroe Islands and in arctic northern Norway north to Kirkenes.

It has hybridised in cultivation with the closely related Syringa komarowii from China; the hybrid is named Syringa × josiflexa.

References

External links

 

josikaea
Flora of Europe
Flora of Hungary
Flora of Romania
Flora of Ukraine
Plants described in 1830
Garden plants
Taxa named by Ludwig Reichenbach